An enterogastrone is any hormone secreted by the mucosa of the duodenum in the lower gastrointestinal tract in response to dietary lipids that inhibits the caudal (or "forward, analward") motion of the contents of chyme. The function of enterogasterone is almost the same as gastric inhibitor peptide, it inhibits gastric secretion and motility of the stomach.

Examples
Examples include:
 Secretin
 Cholecystokinin

References

External links
 

Digestive system